Victor Matine is a Mozambican teacher and football coach who became manager of the Mozambique national football team in July 2019. He has previously coached the under-20 and under-23 national teams, as well as club side CD UP Manica.

References

Date of birth missing (living people)
Living people
Mozambican football managers
Mozambique national football team managers
Year of birth missing (living people)